Itami Station is the name of two train stations in Itami, Hyogo, Japan:

 Itami Station (JR West)
 Itami Station (Hankyu)